Georges Labazée (16 June 1943 – 4 February 2022) was a French politician. He was a senator from 2011 to 2017. Born in France, Labazée died on 4 February 2022, at the age of 78.

References

1943 births
2022 deaths
20th-century French politicians
21st-century French politicians
French Senators of the Fifth Republic
Deputies of the 7th National Assembly of the French Fifth Republic
Departmental councillors (France)
Socialist Party (France) politicians
People from Béarn